Dinio García Leyva (born February 14, 1972) is a Cuban singer.

Biography
Dinio wrote his own autobiography (see below under Books) and recorded a single which in the week of June 9, 2003 became the number 1 in sales in Spain. It also rose as high as number 62 in Billboard's official Eurochart Hot 100 Singles for the week of June 21, 2003.

Reality Shows

Partial filmography
 Plauto, recuerdo distorsionado de un tonto eventual (2004) aka Plauto (Spain: short title) (USA) as Brothel Client

References

Books

Notes

External links
 
 
 Top 20 and Top 100 Ranking

1972 births
Living people
Cuban male singers
Cuban emigrants to Spain
People from Havana
21st-century Spanish singers
21st-century Spanish male singers